The 6th Mirchi Music Awards, presented by the Radio Mirchi, honoured the best of Hindi music from the year 2013. The ceremony was held on 27 February 2014 and was hosted by Sonu Nigam. There were many performances, including those by Sunidhi Chauhan, Arijit Singh, Ankit Tiwari and Mika Singh, who gave a tribute to R. D. Burman for his 75th birth anniversary. Aashiqui 2 won a leading eight awards including Album of the Year and Song of the Year for "Tum Hi Ho".

Winners and nominees 

The winners were selected by the members of jury, chaired by Javed Akhtar. The following are the names of winners.

Film awards

Technical awards

Non-film awards

Special awards

Listeners' Choice awards

Jury awards

Films with multiple wins 

 Won two Listeners' Choice  awards

Jury 
The jury was chaired by Javed Akhtar. Other members were:

 Aadesh Shrivastava - music composer and singer
 Alka Yagnik - playback singer
 Anu Malik - music director
 Anurag Basu - director, producer and screenwriter
 Ila Arun - actress and folk singer
 Irshad Kamil - lyricist
 Lalit Pandit - composer
 Kavita Krishnamurthy - playback singer
 Louis Banks - composer, record producer and singer
 Prasoon Joshi - lyricist and screenwriter
 Ramesh Sippy - director and producer
 Sadhana Sargam - playback singer
 Sameer - lyricist
 Sapna Mukherjee - playback singer
 Shailendra Singh - playback singer
 Shankar Mahadevan - composer and playback singer
 Sooraj Barjatya - director, producer and screenwriter
 Subhash Ghai- director, producer and screenwriter
 Sudhir Mishra - director and screenwriter
 Suresh Wadkar - playback singer
 Swanand Kirkire - lyricist
 Talat Aziz - singer

See also 
 Mirchi Music Awards

References

External links 
 

Mirchi Music Awards